The Isaaq Sultanate (Wadaad:) was a Somali kingdom that ruled parts of the Horn of Africa during the 18th and 19th centuries. It spanned the territories of the Isaaq clan in modern-day Somaliland and Ethiopia. The sultanate was governed by the Rer Guled branch of the Eidagale clan and is the pre-colonial predecessor to the modern Republic of Somaliland.

History

Origins
According to oral tradition, prior to the Guled Dynasty the Isaaq clan-family were ruled by a dynasty of the Tolje'lo branch starting from, descendants of Ahmed nicknamed Tol Je'lo, the eldest son of Sheikh Ishaaq's Harari wife. There were eight Tolje'lo rulers in total, starting with Boqor Harun who ruled for centuries starting from the 13th century. The last Tolje'lo ruler Garad Dhuh Barar was overthrown by a coalition of Isaaq clans. The once strong Tolje'lo clan were scattered and took refuge amongst the Habr Awal with whom they still mostly live.

Establishment
The modern Guled Dynasty of the Isaaq Sultanate was established in the middle of the 18th century by Sultan Guled of the Eidagale line of the Garhajis clan. His coronation took place after the victorious battle of Lafaruug in 1749 in which his father, a religious mullah Chief Abdi Chief Eisa successfully led the Isaaq in battle and defeated the Absame tribes near Berbera where a century earlier the Isaaq clan expanded into. After witnessing his leadership and courage, the Isaaq chiefs recognized his father Abdi who refused the position instead relegating the title to his underage son Guled while the father acted as the regent until the son came of age. Guled was crowned the as the first Sultan of the Isaaq clan in July 1750. Sultan Guled thus ruled the Isaaq up until his death in 1839, where he was succeeded by his eldest son Farah full brother of Yuusuf and Du'ale, all from Guled's fourth wife Ambaro Me'ad Gadid.

Early European Conflict

With the new European incursion into the Gulf of Aden and Horn of Africa contact between Somalis and Europeans on African soil would happen again for the first time since the Ethiopian–Adal war. When a British vessel named the Mary Anne attempted to dock in Berbera's port in 1825 it was attacked and multiple members of the crew were massacred by the Habr Awal. In response the Royal Navy enforced a blockade and some accounts narrate a bombardment of the city. In 1827 two years later the British arrived and extended an offer to relieve the blockade which had halted Berbera's lucrative trade in exchange for indemnity. Following this initial suggestion the Battle of Berbera 1827 would break out. After the Isaaq defeat, 15,000 Spanish dollars was to be paid by the Isaaq Sultanate leaders for the destruction of the ship and loss of life. In the 1820s Sultan Farah Sultan Guled of the Isaaq Sultanate penned a letter to Sultan bin Saqr Al Qasimi of Ras Al Khaimah requesting military assistance and joint religious war against the British. This would not materialize as Sultan Saqr was incapacitated by prior Persian Gulf campaign of 1819 and was unable to send aid to Berbera. Alongside their stronghold in the Persian Gulf & Gulf of Oman the Qasimi were very active both militarily and economically in the Gulf of Aden and were given to plunder and attack ships as far west as the Mocha on the Red Sea. They had numerous commercial ties with the Somalis, leading vessels from Ras Al Khaimah and the Persian Gulf to regularly attend trade fairs in the large ports of Berbera and Zeila and were very familiar with the Isaaq Sultanate respectively.
.

Berbera Civil War
One of the most important settlements of the Sultanate was the city of Berbera which was one of the key ports of the Gulf of Aden. Caravans would pass through Hargeisa and the Sultan would collect tribute and taxes from traders before they would be allowed to continue onwards to the coast. Following a massive conflict between the Ayal Ahmed and Ayal Yunis branches of the Habr Awal over who would control Berbera in the mid-1840s, Sultan Farah brought both subclans before a holy relic from the tomb of Aw Barkhadle. An item that is said to have belonged to Bilal Ibn Rabah.
When any grave question arises affecting the interests of the Isaakh tribe in general. On a paper yet carefully preserved in the tomb, and bearing the sign-manual of Belat [Bilal], the slave of one [of] the early khaleefehs, fresh oaths of lasting friendship and lasting alliances are made...In the season of 1846 this relic was brought to Berbera in charge of the Haber Gerhajis, and on it the rival tribes of Aial Ahmed and Aial Yunus swore to bury all animosity and live as brethren.

Fracture and Decline

Habr Yunis Sultanate

During the reign of Sultan Farah Guled the Habr Yunis would break from his rule and form the Habr Yunis Sultanate. Sultan Deria Sugulle would have established his own capital at Wadhan and his own taxes. The Habr Yunis Sultanate inherited the profitable trade routes leading into the Sheikh mountains and Burao from the Isaaq Sultanate and reached a pinnacle under Sultan Hersi Aman before being engulfed in civil wars after his considerable power caused a rebellion to break out in the late 1870s.

The split was noticeable and Lieutenant C.P Rigby in the year 1848 writes about the two Sultans and the capital of the Isaaq at Toon. 
The Hubr Gajis tribe and its different branches are governed by two Sultans, named Sultan Deriah [Habr Yunis Sultan] and Sultan Farah: the residence of the latter is at Toro.

Internal Eidagale Conflicts

During the reign of the last ruler of the Isaaq Sultanate Deria Hassan tensions were high between his Rer Guled and another subclan of Eidagale. The legendary Eidagale warrior and poet Hussein Hasan who hailed from the Rer Guled was prideful and urged them to continue the conflict. Standing against him was a similarly skilled poet and warrior Hersi Absiyeh, a prominent member of the closely related Rer Abdi Bari who were warring with the Rer Guled. He called for the regular shir or meeting of subclans where he would take council and advise on what decisions to make next. Sultan Deria ruled that blood payment or mag was sufficient for both parties to exchange at the shir with the Rer Guled losing six and the Abdi Bari six as well. Hussein Hasan was boastful and urged for continued conflict with a rousing gabay rejecting the decision.

Sultan Deria responded by sending Hussein away to Berbera and then resuming the shir. Absiyeh was made to swear a solemn oath not to recite a gabay following the Sultan's decision but he could not resist, especially since Hussein was away. Hussein returned and lamented that he missed the occasion and the two other men (Deria and Absiyeh) prevailed that day.

Egyptian occupation 

In 1870 The Egyptians occupied Hargeisa after failing to take over Aussa. They continued on to invade Berbera, Zeila, Sagallo, and Bulhar. They helped rebuild a dying Berbera economy, and established Berbera as the capital of the Khedive in east Africa. Although they did not control northern Somaliland for long they did build lighthouses, piers, improved coastal ports, and promoted Islam. In 1883 the Egyptians who were being pressured by the British decided to evacuate the Somali, and Oromo cities. During the Egyptian rule the Somalis controlled the Zeila-Harar trade route, and the Oromos shared the Berbera-Harar trade route. British officer Hunters carried a number of surveys in the Somali coast. He described the Habr Awal as a friendly people who lived between Harar, and Berbera, and that they supported the Egyptian capture of many towns. In 1884 the Egyptians, and Habr Awal burnt down a number of Bursuuk villages, in retaliation the Bursuuk attacked Habr Awal caravans on their way to Berbera.  During the withdrawal period officer Hunters was more concerned on Berbera as rumour spread about the Mahdiyya of Sudan. He worried about Berbera more than Harar, because the Habr Awal Somalis had murdered the Governor of Berbera Abd- Al Rahman Bey. They did this because Abd Al Rahman had murdered a Somali in an attempt to rob a caravan. He also feared the Issa Somali would invade Berbera so he ordered a British warship be anchored at Berbera so the British could detect any Somali movement in the area. Hunter also writes that the Emir of Zeila, Abu Bakr was possibly planning an invasion of Berbera. Hinter describes Abu Bakr as a Afar businessmen, and Emir who held great influence over the Afar, and Somalis. He also describes him as a slave master, and that he controlled slave trade in the read sea.  Hunters describes the Governor of Berbera as a man who was ready to take any command, but like all his friends was thuggish, and rude. In 1884 the British signed a deal with the Habr Awal which allowed British presence in Berbera for a while. in October 1884 the Egyptians left Berbera.

Incorporation into British Somaliland

By the early 1880s the Isaaq Sultanate had been reduced to the Ciidangale confederation with the Eidagale, Arap and Ishaaq Arreh subclan of the Habr Yunis remaining. In 1884–1886 the British signed treaties with the coastal subclans and had not yet penetrated the interior in any significant way. Sultan Deria Hassan remained de facto master of Hargeisa and its environs. Working in conjunction with Mohammed Abdullah Hassan and the Dervish Movement he would exchange letters with Hassan in the first year of the movement's foundation and incited an insurrection in Hargeisa in 1900.

Arap Revolt
The Arap were unable to break from Eidagale tutelage and decided to stand and change this situation. Led by their famed warrior and poet Farah Nur the Arap crowned him as Sultan and raised arms against the Eidagale and Sultan Deria Hassan.

Composing this poem entitled The Limits of Submission Farah speaks of the conflict and intolerance to the subordinate status to the Sultan.

Although the odds were not in their favor, the Arap were victorious in their campaign for independence.

Economy
The Sultanate had a robust economy and trade was significant at the main port of Berbera but also eastwards along the coast. The Berbera trade fair was the major commercial event of the year with tens of thousands descending on the town.

Berbera held an annual fair during the cool rain-free months between October and April. This long drawn out market handled immense quantities of coffee, gum Arabic, myrrh and other commodities. These goods in the early nineteenth century were almost exclusively handled by Somalis who, Salt says, had "a kind of navigation act by which they exclude the Arab vessels from their ports and bring the produce of their country either to Aden or Mocha in their own dows."

Eidagale and Habr Yunis traders held the southerly trade routes into the Haud region and the Habr Awal the westerly ones, with the Habr Je'lo maintaining the easterly routes towards Berbera and their substantial frankincense trade exporting from Heis, Karin, and Ceel Daraad. The western and southern routes would merge at Hargeisa. The Isaaq were also the predominant Somali traders in the Yemeni ports of Mukalla, Mocha and Aden. In addition the sultanate produced ghee, myrrh, ivory and gum arabic, which would then be exported to Yemen.

Administration

The Sultan of Isaaq often called for shirs or regular meetings where he would be informed and advised by leading elders or religious figures on what decisions to make. In the case of the Dervish movement Sultan Deria Hassan had chosen not to join after receiving counsel from Sheikh Madar. He addressed early tensions between the Saad Musa and Eidagale upon the former's settlement into the growing town of Hargeisa in the late 19th century.

The Sultan would also be responsible for organizing grazing rights and in the late 19th century new agricultural spaces. The allocation of resources and sustainable use of them was also a matter that Sultans concerned themselves with and was crucial in an arid region. In the 1870s there was a famous meeting between Sheikh Madar and Sultan Deria proclaimed that hunting and tree cutting in the vicinity of Hargeisa would be banned 

The holy relics from Aw Barkhadle would be brought and the Isaaqs would swear oaths upon it in presence of the Sultan whenever fierce internal combat broke out. Aside from the leading Sultan of Isaaq there were numerous Akils, Garaads and subordinate Sultans alongside religious authorities that constituted the Sultanate before some would declare their own independence or simply break from his authority.

Rulers
The Isaaq Sultanate has ten rulers in total, five prior to the creation of British Somaliland in 1884 in addition to five afterwards. Historically Sultans would be chosen by a committee of several important members of the various Isaaq clans. Sultans were usually buried at Toon south of Hargeisa which was a significant site and the capital of the Sultanate during Farah Guled's rule.

Legacy
Amongst the Isaaq the traditional institution and leadership of the clan survived the British Somaliland period into present times. The Rer Guled Sultans, although no longer ruling vast territory, and with separate Isaaq subclans having their own Sultans, still enjoy primus inter pares status and retain the title of Suldaanka Guud ee Beesha Isaaq (Grand Sultan of the Isaaq). Sultan Deria Hassan continued in his role until his death in 1939, with his son Sultan Abdillahi Deria strongly involved in the independence movement of British Somaliland. Sultan Rashid Abdillahi represented Somalia at the world parliamentary conference in 1967.

With the collapse of the Somali Republic, and the subsequent Somaliland war of independence in the 80s and 90s, Sultan Mahamed Abdiqadir would be heavily involved in the peace process and reconciliation of the rebirthed Somaliland. With Somaliland's independence in 1991 the Isaaq sultans assumed the title of Grand Sultan of Somaliland (Suldaanka Guud ee Soomaaliland).

See also 

Somalia–Somaliland border
Ethiopia–Somaliland border

References

 
Former empires in Africa
Former countries in Africa
Somali empires
States and territories established in 1750
Early Modern history of Somaliland
Modern history of Somaliland
Former sultanates
States and territories established in the 18th century
States and territories disestablished in the 19th century
States and territories disestablished in the 1880s
Former countries